Anne Johnson is a British archaeologist and researcher.

Ann(e) Johnson may also refer to:

Anne Johnson Davis, author
 Dame Anne Mandall Johnson, British epidemiologist
Anne-Marie Johnson, American actress
Ann Johnson (athlete), British sprinter
Ann Johnson (politician), American politician
Ann Johnson (dancer); see Savoy-style Lindy Hop

See also
Annie Johnson (disambiguation)
Anne Johnston (disambiguation)
Anna Johnson (disambiguation)
Anne Johnstone (disambiguation)
Johnson